"Life's Been Good" is a song by American singer-songwriter and multi-instrumentalist Joe Walsh that first appeared on the soundtrack to the 1978 film FM.  The original eight-minute version was released on Walsh's 1978 album But Seriously, Folks..., and an edited four-minute single version peaked at No. 12 on the US Billboard Hot 100, remaining his biggest solo hit.

In the song, Walsh satirically reflects on the antics and excesses of the era's rock stars, with nods to Keith Moon and others: "I live in hotels, tear out the walls/I have accountants pay for it all", and "My Maserati does one-eighty-five/I lost my license, now I don't drive".  

The 1979 Rolling Stone Record Guide called it "riotous", and "(maybe) the most important statement on rock stardom anyone has made in the late Seventies". His later Ordinary Average Guy is written as a late-life followup.

Content
"Life's Been Good" has a mid-tempo, reggae-like groove marked by bedrock guitar riffs, synthesizers, and humorous lyrics.  According to Billboard, the lyrics are at least partially autobiographical. Walsh's ARP Odyssey synthesizer riff accompanies the lead guitar in the middle of the song. The lead guitar in the outro is accompanied by the main riff. Bill Szymczyk and Jody Boyer perform the backing vocals.

The pre-chorus section on the second and third verses uses a call and response pattern.
Joe Walsh: "Lucky I'm sane after all I've been through"
Call: Bill Szymczyk: "Everybody say I'm cool"
Response: Jody Boyer: "He's cool"

Joe Walsh: "They say I'm lazy but it takes all my time"
Call: Bill Szymczyk: "Everybody say, "Oh, yeah""
Response: Jody Boyer: "Oh, yeah!"

Record World said that the song "blends [Walsh's] signature guitar work with a touch of reggae" and that "the lyrics touch on a number of topics, all treated with a light irony."

At the end of the LP, there is a clip of an inside joke stating "uh-oh, here comes a flock of wah wahs", recorded from inside the studio. After the music has faded away into silence, there's a 10-second gap before the inside joke. That inside joke would also be included at the end of disc one of the Eagles' box set, Selected Works: 1972–1999.

Made after Walsh had joined the Eagles, "Life's Been Good" was incorporated into that group's concert repertoire, appearing in shows at the time as well as reunion tours. It remains a staple of classic rock radio playlists. A live version of the song with the Eagles appears on the 1980 album Eagles Live, where some of the lyrics are changed.

Inspiration
In a 2012 concert at the Troubadour in West Hollywood, California, Walsh explained that the song's lyrics are true. He said that he purchased a home in Santa Barbara, California, shortly before he joined the Eagles. He then spent the next two years touring or recording albums and very little time at home. Rather, he spent most of his time living in hotels. He preferred hotel rooms with adjoining rooms. If a hotel room did not have two adjoining rooms available, he would rent two rooms next to each other. He would then make a connection to the other room by "tearing out a wall". He did not own a Maserati. He lost his wallet and his driver's license was in the wallet. His license was not taken away by the government. Walsh often rode in limousines. He does have an office with gold records on the wall and an answering machine. Walsh said he had been to parties and stayed late on many occasions. One time, he attempted to leave the party in the early morning hours. However, instead of going out the front door of the house, he walked into a closet.

Samples

 In 2013, this song was sampled on Eminem's "So Far..." off The Marshall Mathers LP 2, produced by Rick Rubin.
 Reggae-rock group Dirty Heads heavily interpolated the song in their 2022 single "Life's Been Good", from their album Midnight Control.

Chart performance

Weekly charts

Year-end charts

References

1978 singles
Joe Walsh songs
Songs written by Joe Walsh
Song recordings produced by Bill Szymczyk
Blues rock songs
1978 songs
Asylum Records singles